The Madera County Arts Council is the official Madera County, California, USA arts council.

A partner in the state-local partnership of the California Arts Council since 1982.

A private, non-profit organization working to support and promote all arts in Madera County.

Blends the expertise from many partnerships and twenty-one directors to create the necessary link between the arts and community development.

The Madera County Arts Council runs under the California state arts council, the California Arts Council (CAC).

Programs

Arts in education

Circle Gallery
A non-profit Gallery showcasing and promoting the juried work of the area’s professional artists.

Scholarship and grant program
Serving graduating high school seniors and county arts groups.

External links
Madera County Arts Council website

Arts councils of California
Madera County, California